The Hobart Statesmen men's lacrosse team represents the Hobart and William Smith Colleges in National Collegiate Athletic Association (NCAA) Division I college lacrosse. The program was created in 1898 and plays its home games at Boswell Field. The Statesmen competed in the Northeast Conference from 2014 to 2022, with previous conference membership in the Patriot League and the ECAC Lacrosse League as a Division I program. Starting with the 2023 season, Hobart will play in the newly established men's lacrosse league of the Atlantic 10 Conference (A-10). Through 2022, the team has an all–time record of 801-521-20.

Hobart has captured 16 national championships, including two NCAA Division II championships and 13 NCAA Division III championships. The athletics program elevated its team to NCAA Division I in 1995 to preserve its historic lacrosse rivalries with Cornell and Syracuse. Despite an effort to reclassify the Statesmen back to Division III in 2008 by the college’s Board of Trustees, a strong response from Hobart’s alumni base prevented the change and kept the program in Division I.

In 2014, Hobart joined the Northeast Conference (NEC) as an associate member in men’s lacrosse, increasing the conference’s membership to 7 teams. During their stint in the conference, the Statesmen won league tournament and regular season championships in 2016 and 2017 respectively, making their fifth NCAA tournament appearance at the Division I level in 2016. Hobart left NEC men's lacrosse after the 2022 season to join the newly established A-10 men's lacrosse league.

Season results
The following is a list of Hobart's results by season since the institution of NCAA Division I in 1971:

{| class="wikitable"

|- align="center"

†NCAA canceled 2020 collegiate activities due to COVID-19.

See also
Cornell–Hobart lacrosse rivalry
Hobart–Syracuse lacrosse rivalry

References

External links
Official Website